Matthew Todd Mieske (born February 13, 1968) is a former outfielder in Major League Baseball (MLB) who played from  to  for the Milwaukee Brewers, Chicago Cubs, Seattle Mariners, Houston Astros and Arizona Diamondbacks.

In 663 games over eight seasons, Mieske posted a .262 batting average (406-for-1547) with 225 runs, 78 doubles, 10 triples, 56 home runs, 226 RBI, 124 bases on balls, .318 on-base percentage and .434 slugging percentage. He finished his career with a .979 fielding percentage playing at all three outfield positions.

External links

1968 births
Living people
Milwaukee Brewers players
Chicago Cubs players
Seattle Mariners players
Houston Astros players
Arizona Diamondbacks players
Baseball players from Michigan
Major League Baseball right fielders
Sportspeople from Midland, Michigan
Western Michigan Broncos baseball players
Spokane Indians players
High Desert Mavericks players
Denver Zephyrs players
New Orleans Zephyrs players
Iowa Cubs players
Tucson Sidewinders players